Clogau Quarry (also known as the Berwyn Slate Quarry) is a quarry which is a Site of Special Scientific Interest located in Denbighshire, Wales. It supports the Llangollen canal, along with the Oernant Quarry. The quarry is used for hearths, worktops, tombstones and billiard tables.

Description 
Clogau Quarry is located on the east side of Moel y Gamelin (also known as the Maesyrychen Mountain). It's situated 1360 feet above sea level.

History 
The Clogau Quarry was first established in 1690, making it one of the oldest quarries in Wales. It is believed that the Quarry was never used until the 19th century.

References 

Sites of Special Scientific Interest in Clwyd
Quarries in Wales
Denbighshire
1690 establishments in the British Empire